Appat Island (old spelling: Agpat) is an uninhabited island in the Avannaata municipality in northwestern Greenland.
At , it is one of the larger islands in the Uummannaq Fjord system, located in its north-central part. It is the site of the former settlements of Ritenbenck and Qaqortuatsiaq.

Air Greenland helicopters approach Ukkusissat Heliport on the way from Uummannaq Heliport alongside the southern and western wall of Appat, to then pass above the narrow Appat Ikerat strait between Appat and a smaller, mountainous Salleq Island.

Geography 

Appat Island is separated from Uummannaq Island and Salliaruseq Island in the south by the central arm of the Uummannaq Fjord; from the Salleq Island in the west by the Appat Ikerat strait; from the Ukkusissat Peninsula in the north and northeast by the Torsukattak Strait. A small archipelago of low-lying skerries lies directly to the southeast of the island, with a small settlement of Saattut.

It is very mountainous, with precipitous walls falling from the glaciated summit plateau in all directions. The plateau (and the island itself) is bisected by the Naqellorssuaq valley. The highest point on the island is Appat Qaqaa,  a summit in the western part of the glaciated summit plateau. The coastline is undeveloped, apart from the Umiasuqasuup Ilua fjord at the southeastern end.

Promontories

Mining 
Qaqortuatsiaq, located on the northern coast of Appat near the shore of the Torsukattak Strait, is a former marble quarry, now abandoned. Mining activities in the area are likely to resume in the future, providing an economic lifeline to the communities of the Uummannaq region, keeping the relatively new Qaarsut Airport open.

Access 
The island can be reached via individually chartered fishing boats from Saattut, the settlement on a skerry off the southeastern cape, or from Ukkusissat to the northwest. Package tourists visit the 'desert' on the cape as part of an organized tour from Uummannaq. Movement within the interior of Appat is restricted to mountaineering.

See also
List of islands of Greenland

References

External links 

 Volcanic development in the Nuussuaq Basin, West Greenland

Uninhabited islands of Greenland
Uummannaq Fjord